2 Nuts and a Richard! (original French-language title: Les Grandes Gueules s'animent!) is a Canadian adult animated sitcom based on the radio show hosted by Quebecois comedy group Les Grandes Gueules. It premiered in French on Télétoon la nuit on September 2, 2015, with an English premiere on Teletoon at Night following on October 16, 2015. On April 3, 2017, it aired reruns on MuchMusic.

Development
Production on the series was first announced in May 2014, with the show's concept described as adapting popular sketches from the long running Les Grandes Gueules radio show. Cast members Mario Tessier, José Gaudet and host Richard Turcotte were confirmed to return. In the English version, they're voiced by Carlo Mestroni, Shawn Baichoo and Thor Bishopric, respectively. To support the first season's launch, a game was released for browsers and mobile platforms.

A second season, consisting of 12 half-hours, began airing on Télétoon and Noovo on September 4, 2017. It was not released in English.

Episodes

Season 1

Season 2

Home Video
The first 13 episodes were released in French on DVD in Canada by DEP Distribution on December 16, 2016.

See also
The Ricky Gervais Show

References

External links
2 Nuts and a Richard! at Oasis Animation
Les Grandes Gueules s'animent! I at Oasis Animation
Les Grandes Gueules s'animent! II at Oasis Animation

2015 Canadian television series debuts
2017 Canadian television series endings
2010s Canadian adult animated television series
2010s Canadian animated comedy television series
2010s Canadian sitcoms
Canadian adult animated comedy television series
Canadian animated sitcoms
English-language television shows
Teletoon original programming